Kim Yun-ji (born January 16, 2000) is a South Korean handball player currently playing for Samcheok City of the Handball Korea League. She competed in the 2020 Summer Olympics.

References

External links
 
 Samcheok City Handball Club 

South Korean female handball players
Olympic handball players of South Korea
Handball players at the 2020 Summer Olympics
Place of birth missing (living people)
2000 births
Living people